Michael Baroch (born 1 June 1966) is an Australian former professional tennis player. He won the boys' doubles title at the 1984 Australian Open, with Mark Kratzmann as his partner.

Baroch, who reached a career high singles ranking of 434, qualified for the main draw of the 1987 Australian Open and lost in the first round to Mark Woodforde. He also featured in qualifying draws for the Wimbledon Championships.

Junior Grand Slam finals

Doubles: 1 (1 title)

References

External links
 
 

1966 births
Living people
Australian male tennis players
Grand Slam (tennis) champions in boys' doubles
Australian Open (tennis) junior champions